Guazhou County, formerly (until 2006) Anxi County or Ansichow, is a county in the northwest of Gansu province, the People's Republic of China. It is under the administration of Jiuquan City.

History 
 
Emperor Wudi (140-87 BCE) had the Great Wall extended northwestward all the way to the Gate of Jade (Yumen Pass), the westernmost garrison town near Dunhuang. He then set up a system of garrisons all along this part of the Great Wall and put its headquarters in a town called Anxi (“Tranquil West”) and where the northern and southern Silk Routes historically diverged." The name Guazhou (land/prefecture of melons) has a long contentious history; the name first appeared in records from the Warring States period, but Chinese historians have debated (since the 3rd century) whether it referred to a region in modern-day Gansu or Shaanxi. From Northern Wei to Sui dynasty, Guazhou Prefecture contained both modern-day Dunhuang and Guazhou counties; in the Tang dynasty, the western region surrounding Dunhuang was renamed "Western Shazhou" while the region around Anxi was named Guazhou, with both falling under the administrative unit of "Shazhou". Later, Shazhou became the exclusive name of the region around Dunhuang. The naming of these two regions (Shazhou and Guazhou) largely persisted till the Qing dynasty. In the 18th century, the Qing dynasty replaced the regional names "Shazhou" and "Guazhou" with the names of their largest cities, Dunhuang and Anxi. Since the modern era, Dunhuang County continues to be the name for the western county; however, Anxi County decided to revert to the Guazhou name in 2006 due to its greater recognizability in historical texts, with tourism in mind.

Administrative divisions
Guazhou County is divided to 9 towns, 1 ethnic town, 2 townships, 3 ethnic townships and 1 other.
Towns

Ethnic towns
 Yaozhanzi Dongxiang Town()

Townships
 Bulongji Township()
 Lianghu Township()

Ethnic townships
 Qidun Huizu Dongxiang Township()
 Guangzhi Tibetan Township()
 Shahe Hui Township

Others
 State-owned Xiaowan Farm

Climate

Economy
The county's location is ideally suited for wind farms, earning the nickname "world's wind warehouse". From the east the wind blows through a high, narrow valley formed by the Qilian and Beishan mountains, reaching  8.3 metres per second and energy density of 703 watts per cubic metre.

Transport 
The mainline Lanxin Railway and branch line Dunhuang Railway intersect at Liugou Railway Station in the county. Xiaowan and Guazhou are the two other stations on the Dunhuang Railway located in the county.

There are two national highways running through the country, China National Highway 215 (Hongliuyuan) and China National Highway 312 (Hongliuyuan).

See also
 List of administrative divisions of Gansu
 Suoyang City
 Yulin Caves

Footnotes

References
 Liu, Xinru (2010). The Silk Road in World History. Oxford University Press. .

 
Guazhou County
Jiuquan